The 1996 Honduran Cup was the 7th edition of the Cup tournament in the Honduran football. C.D. Platense won its first title after finishing in first position at the end of nine rounds in the 1996–97 regular season of the Honduran league.

Results

Standings

Honduran Cup seasons
Cup